Al Ain University (AAU), formerly the Al Ain University of Science and Technology, is a private university with its main campus in Al Ain, United Arab Emirates, and a satellite campus in Abu Dhabi. It was founded in 2004 by UAE's first President, Sheikh Zayed bin Sultan al-Nahyan.

Overview 
Al Ain University (AAU) is licensed by the UAE Ministry of Higher Education and Scientific Research. AAU uses English as a medium of instruction. It has two campuses - in Abu Dhabi, the capital of the UAE, and in Al Ain, the garden city of the UAE. Since the establishment of the university in 2005, the student enrollment has tripled, including students from the UAE and more than thirty nationalities. In the 2014–2015 academic year, the university had 1204 new students enrolled across its bachelors and masters programs.

The university offers accredited programs through its colleges (Business Administration, Education, Engineering and I.T, Law and Pharmacy) with 11 baccalaureate degrees. It offers a master's degree in business administration (MBA) and a Professional Diploma in Education.

Colleges

 College of Engineering 
College of Pharmacy
 College of Law
 College of Education, Humanities & Social Sciences
 College of Business
 College of Communication and Media

Accreditation
AAU is a licensed CAA institution by the UAE Ministry of Higher Education and Scientific Research

International Certification in the College of Pharmacy

Admission
AAU admission policy is based on students' academic achievements in the secondary school certificate or its equivalent, regardless of gender, race, color, religion, age, handicap or national origin. The student may be accepted in AAU either as a full-time student or part-time student.

References

 Commission for Academic Accreditation
 Ministry of Higher Education & Scientific Research

External links
 University official website

2004 establishments in the United Arab Emirates
Educational institutions established in 2004
Universities and colleges in the Emirate of Abu Dhabi
Buildings and structures in Al Ain
Education in Al Ain